Scoparia cinefacta is a species of moth in the family Crambidae. It is endemic to New Zealand.

Taxonomy

This species was described by Alfred Philpott in 1926. However the placement of this species within the genus Scoparia is in doubt. As a result, this species has also been referred to as Scoparia (s.l.) cinefacta.

Description

The wingspan is 19–20 mm. The forewings are pale bluish-grey with an X-shaped fuscous-black reniform spot. The hindwings are fuscous-grey. Adults have been recorded on wing in January.

References

Moths described in 1926
Moths of New Zealand
Scorparia
Endemic fauna of New Zealand
Endemic moths of New Zealand